The Citizens' List (Danish: Borgerlisten) in Kerteminde is a Danish local political party.

History
The party was founded November 21, 2008 by former member of Venstre, Jørgen Schou. Kåre Jørgensen, also from Venstre, and Erling Knudsen from Conservative People's Party both joined Schou's newly founded party. In 2009 Søren Lilienhoff is elected the leader of the party. At the 2009 local elections, three members of the Citizens' List was elected into the municipal council in Kerteminde Municipality, with the party receiving 12.6% of the votes in the municipality. Citizens' List supports the independent politician Sonja Rasmussen, who becomes the mayor of the municipality. Sonja Rasmussen joins Citizens' List in 2012. In the 2013 local elections, the party receives six seats in the municipal council in Kerteminde, receiving 21.0% of the votes in the municipality.

Election results

Municipal elections

References

Local political parties in Denmark
Political parties established in 2008
2008 establishments in Denmark